Kolej Islam Sultan Alam Shah (abbreviated KISAS; formerly known as Kolej Islam Klang) is an Islamic boarding school in Klang, Selangor. It was bestowed the title Sekolah Berprestasi Tinggi (High Performing School)  in 2010 by the Ministry Of Education. Among others, the school is noted for its Silat and Nasheed teams. The school has also played host for bench marking visits on areas such as Arabic Language, Public Speaking and Silat. In the 2013 Sijil Pelajaran Malaysia (SPM), the school obtained GPS of 1.27.

History
Islamic College of Malaya (Malay: Kolej Islam Malaya, KIM) was founded in 1955 (1374 AH). KIM was built on a plot of land measuring approximately 14.3 acres located at Jalan Kota Raja, about half a mile from Klang.

The college originated as a palace, later donated by Sultan Hisamuddin Alam Shah Al-Haj, hoping that it would give birth to scholars who follow Allah's guidance, illuminating society with the spirit of Islam and to eliminate every form of injustice and ignorance.

In 1966 (1386 AH), the college moved to a new building in Petaling Jaya (the current International Islamic University Malaysia Centre for Foundation Studies) and Bangi (the current National University of Malaysia Faculty of Islamic Studies), yet still continued its preparation courses in Klang.

In 1967, the college, taken by the Ministry of Education was converted into a government-aided school known as Klang Islamic College (Malay: Kolej Islam Klang, KIK). Finally, in 1972, it was turned into a fully residential school with great facilities until today.

In 1989, KIK was renamed Sultan Alam Shah Islamic College (Malay: Kolej Islam Sultan Alam Shah, KISAS) by Sultan Salahuddin Abdul Aziz Shah al-Haj. Until now, the former Sultan's palace is still standing.

KISAS was recognised as a Cluster School in 2007 and as a High-Performing School in 2010.

Association of former students

Persatuan Alumni Kolej Islam, Klang, Malaysia (ALKIS) is the association of former students of the Islamic College for the three Islamic Colleges of :

 Islamic College of Malaya / Kolej Islam Malaya (KIM), 
 Klang Islamic College / Kolej Islam Klang (KIK) 
 Sultan Alam Shah Islamic College (SASIC) / Kolej Islam Sultan Alam Shah (KISAS)

ALKIS is also known as the Islamic College Alumni Association, Klang, Malaysia or Persatuan Alumni Kolej Islam, Klang, Malaysia (ALKIS).

Notable alumni

Noor Hisham Abdullah - Director General, Ministry of Health - One of the most prominent leaders in the fight against the COVID-19 pandemic in Malaysia.
Anas Alam Faizli - Chief Executive Officer, ProtectHealth - One of the most prominent leaders in the COVID-19 vaccination program in Malaysia
Haron Din - Malaysian Islamic Party former spiritual adviser.
Shamsul Iskandar Md. Akin - Chief of Malacca's, Vice President of Parti Keadilan Rakyat, and Member of Parliament for Bukit Katil constituency.
Faisal Tehrani - Award-winning novelist.
Lo' Lo' Mohd Ghazali - Former member of Parliament of Malaysia for the Titiwangsa constituency in Kuala Lumpur.
Mohd Hayati Othman - Member of Parliament for Pendang constituency.
Mohd Asri Zainul Abidin - Current mufti of Perlis.
Juanda Jaya - Islamic preacher & educationist, Member of Sarawak State Assembly for Jemoreng
Takiyuddin Hassan - Member of Parliament of Kota Bharu, Minister in Prime Minister's Department (Malaysia) for Law and Parliamentary Affairs, Secretary-General of the Pan-Malaysian Islamic Party

See also

Kolej Islam Malaya - Predecessor of Sultan Alam Shah Islamic College
 List of schools in Selangor

References

External links

Alumni Kolej Islam (ALKIS) Official website

Colleges in Malaysia
Islamic schools in Malaysia
1955 establishments in Malaya
Educational institutions established in 1955
Co-educational boarding schools
Schools in Selangor